Peter Hewabettage is a Sri Lankan international footballer who plays as a defender for Navy in the Sri Lanka Football Premier League.

References

Sri Lankan footballers
1991 births
Living people
Sri Lanka international footballers
Sri Lanka Navy SC (football) players
Association football defenders
Sri Lanka Football Premier League players